George Washington Carver High School was a segregated public high school in Dothan, Alabama serving African-American children from 1940 to 1968. In 1969 the students were integrated with white students at Dothan High School.

History
In the 1968–1969 school year a few black students transferred from Carver to Dothan under a choice program. In 1969, six weeks before the start of the school year, a federal judge ruled the plan inadequate and ordered all Carver High School to be integrated with Dothan.

Notable alumni
 Artis Gilmore, National Basketball Association Hall-of-Fame player attended Carver his senior year.

References

Public high schools in Alabama
Historically segregated African-American schools in Alabama
Schools in Houston County, Alabama